Sergiy Stakhovsky was the defending champion but chose not to compete.

Kyle Edmund won the title defeating Bjorn Fratangelo, 6–2, 6–3 in the final.

Seeds

Draw

Finals

Top half

Bottom half

References
 Main Draw
 Qualifying Draw

Levene Gouldin and Thompson Tennis Challenger - Singles
2015 Singles
2015 Levene Gouldin & Thompson Tennis Challenger